Isabella, Isabel, Elizabeth or Elisabeth of Braganza may refer to:

 Isabella of Barcelos (1414–1476), daughter of Afonso, Duke of Braganza, wife of Infante John, Constable of Portugal
 Isabel of Viseu, Duchess of Braganza (1459-1521)
 Isabella of Braganza, Duchess of Guimarães (1514–1576), daughter of Jaime I, Duke of Braganza, wife of Infante Edward, 4th Duke of Guimarães
 Isabel Luísa, Princess of Beira (1668–1690), infanta of Portugal
 Maria Isabel of Braganza (1797–1818), infanta of Portugal, consort Queen of Spain 
 Infanta Isabel Maria of Portugal (1801–1876), infanta of Portugal
 Isabel, Princess Imperial of Brazil (1846–1921)
 Isabel, Duchess of Braganza (born 1966), wife of current claimant to Portuguese throne

See also
Isabella of Portugal (disambiguation)